Leeds North and Grenville North was a federal electoral district represented in the House of Commons of Canada from 1867 to 1904. It was located in the province of Ontario. It was created by the British North America Act of 1867 which allocated one member to the combined riding of the North Riding of Leeds and the North Riding of Grenville.

In 1882, the North Riding of Leeds and Grenville was defined to consist of the townships of South Elmsley, Wolford, Oxford and South Gower, and the villages of Smith's Falls, Kemptville and Merrickville.

The electoral district was abolished in 1903 when it was redistributed between Grenville and Leeds ridings.

Electoral history

 

|}

|}

|}

On Mr. Ferguson being unseated, 10 November 1874:

|}

|}

|}

|}

|}

|}

|}

See also 

 List of Canadian federal electoral districts
 Past Canadian electoral districts

External links 
 Parliamentary website

Former federal electoral districts of Ontario